Eupora is the largest city in Webster County, central Mississippi. The population was 2,197 at the 2010 census.

History
Eupora was established in 1889 by European Americans on a spur track of the Georgia Pacific Railway. While there had been agricultural development prior to this in the county, the railroad stimulated trade and businesses. Today this is the largest city in the county. 

Near here was a site in 1770 of armed conflict among some Native American tribes. The Chakchiuma were destroyed by the allied Choctaw and Chickasaw, who were traditional enemies in the region. They dominated territories in what became Mississippi and Alabama.

In 1904 Bud Simpson, an African-American man also known as Sterling (or Starling) Dunham, was accused of raping some white girls. Not given a trial, he was lynched - hanged from a tree by a mob of 200 cheering white people. They riddled his body with bullets.

Geography
According to the United States Census Bureau, the city has a total area of 3.6 square miles (9.3 km2), of which 3.3 square miles (8.4 km2) is land and 0.3 square mile (0.8 km2) (8.94%) is water.

Demographics

2020 census

As of the 2020 United States census, there were 2,018 people, 816 households, and 566 families residing in the city.

2000 census
As of the census of 2000, there were 2,326 people, 877 households, and 590 families residing in the city. The population density was 714.2 people per square mile (275.5/km2). There were 957 housing units at an average density of 293.9 per square mile (113.3/km2). The racial makeup of the city was 58.86% White, 38.01% African American, 0.13% Native American, 0.17% Asian, 2.28% from other races, and 0.56% from two or more races. Hispanic or Latino of any race were 3.74% of the population.

There were 877 households, out of which 31.9% had children under the age of 18 living with them, 41.3% were married couples living together, 21.2% had a female householder with no husband present, and 32.7% were non-families. 30.4% of all households were made up of individuals, and 16.4% had someone living alone who was 65 years of age or older. The average household size was 2.47 and the average family size was 3.08.

In the city, the population was spread out, with 26.1% under the age of 18, 9.3% from 18 to 24, 24.5% from 25 to 44, 18.1% from 45 to 64, and 22.1% who were 65 years of age or older. The median age was 38 years. For every 100 females, there were 79.5 males. For every 100 females age 18 and over, there were 74.1 males.

The median income for a household in the city was $24,839, and the median income for a family was $37,950. Males had a median income of $26,875 versus $21,458 for females. The per capita income for the city was $12,927. About 20.9% of families and 24.0% of the population were below the poverty line, including 35.6% of those under age 18 and 16.9% of those age 65 or over.

Education
The City of Eupora is served by the Webster County School District.  There are 2 elementary schools, 2 middle schools, 2 high schools, and a career and technical center.

Notable people
 Thomas Abernethy, former U.S. Congressman
 Johnie Hammond, Iowa state legislator
 Joseph Turner Patterson (D) - former Attorney General of Mississippi
 Marckell Patterson, professional basketball player
 Derrick Jones, professional football player.
 Donald C. Simmons, Jr., educator, author, poet and documentary film producer.

References

Cities in Mississippi
Cities in Webster County, Mississippi